was the ninth single by the Japanese rock band The Blue Hearts. It reached #1 on the Oricon charts during the first week of August 1990. The song was also ranked #7 on Oricon's rankings for all of 1990. It was the drama High School Rakugaki, part 2.

Details
"Jōnetsu no Bara" was released as part of The Blue Hearts' fourth album, Bust Waste Hip, which was released shortly afterwards on September 10, 1990, though the arrangement of the song is slightly different.

"Teppō" (鉄砲 Gun), the B-side track, was written by Masatoshi Mashima, the band's guitarist. It is one of the few songs that the band has not performed during a concert.

Cover
The title track was covered by Fujin Rizing!, a fictional ska band from multimedia franchise Argonavis from BanG Dream! and added in the game started on February 19, 2021.

References

1990 singles
Oricon Weekly number-one singles
The Blue Hearts songs
Japanese television drama theme songs
Songs written by Hiroto Kōmoto
1990 songs